This is a list of countries by urbanization.

Methodology 
There are two measures of the degree of urbanization of a population. The first, urban population, describes the percentage of the total population living in urban areas, as defined by the country

The second measure, rate of urbanization, describes the projected average rate of change of the size of the urban population over the given period of time

193 United Nations member states plus the Vatican are given a number, other entries are italicized and unnumbered.

Countries 
The data is taken from the CIA World Factbook with estimates from 2020.

See also
List of countries by urban population
List of Brazilian federative units by urbanization rate

References

External links
2018 Revision of World Urbanization Prospects, Population Division of the Department of Economic and Social Affairs of the United Nations

 
Urbanization
Lists by country
Urban economics
Population statistics